Basic Role-Playing (BRP) is a tabletop role-playing game which originated in the RuneQuest fantasy role-playing game. Chaosium released the BRP standalone booklet in 1980 in the boxed set release of the second edition of RuneQuest. Greg Stafford and Lynn Willis are credited as the authors. Chaosium used the percentile skill-based system as the basis for most of their games, including  Call of Cthulhu, Stormbringer, and Elfquest.

History 
The core rules were originally written by Steve Perrin as part of his game RuneQuest. It was Greg Stafford's idea to simplify the rules (eliminating such things as Strike Ranks and Hit Locations) and issue them in a 16-page booklet called Basic Role-Playing. Over the years several others, including Sandy Petersen, Lynn Willis, and Steve Henderson, contributed to the system.

The BRP was notable for being the first role-playing game system to introduce a full skill system to characters regardless of their profession. This was developed in RuneQuest but was also later adopted by the more skill-oriented Call of Cthulhu.

BRP was conceived of as a generic system for playing any sort of RPG. Specific rule systems to support differing genres can be added to the core rules in a modular design. In order to underscore this, in 1982 Chaosium released the Worlds of Wonder box set, which contained a revised main booklet and several booklets providing the additional rules for playing in specific genres. Superworld, a superhero-themed game, began as a portion of the Worlds of Wonder set. In 2002, a third edition of the core booklet, now titled Basic Roleplaying: The Chaosium System, was released in 2002.

In 2004, Chaosium published the Basic Roleplaying monographs, a series of paperback booklets. The first four monographs (Players Book, Magic Book, Creatures Book, and Gamemaster Book) were essentially RuneQuest 3rd Edition, but with the RuneQuest name and other trademarks removed, as Chaosium had lost the rights to the name but retained copyright of the rules text. Additional monographs allowing for new mechanics, thereby extending the system to other genres, were released in the following years. Many of these monographs reproduced rules from other Chaosium-published BRP games that had gone out of print.

In 2008, Jason Durall and Sam Johnson brought together all of the previous works and updated them to a new edition. This comprehensive book, Basic Roleplaying: The Chaosium System, was nicknamed the "Big Gold Book", and allowed game masters to essentially build their own game from the various subsystems included. A quickstart booklet for new players accompanied it. In 2011 it was then  updated to a second edition.

In 2020, Chaosium released Basic Roleplaying as a System Reference Document (SRD).

Other games published over the years by Chaosium using the BRP ruleset include Ringworld, Hawkmoon, and Nephilim.

Rules system 
BRP is similar to other generic systems such as GURPS, Hero System, or Savage Worlds in that it uses a simple resolution method which can be broadly applied. BRP uses a core set of seven characteristics: Size, Strength, Dexterity, Constitution, Intelligence, Power, and Appearance or Charisma. From those, a character derives scores in various skills, expressed as percentages. These skill scores are the basis of play. When attempting an action, the player rolls percentile dice trying to get a result equal to or lower than the character's current skill score. Each incarnation of the BRP rules has changed or added to the core ideas and mechanics, so that games are not identical. For example, in Call of Cthulhu, skills may never be over 100%, while in Stormbringer skills in excess of 100% are within reach for all characters. Scores can increase through experience checks, the mechanics of which vary in an individual game.

BRP treats armor and defense as separate functions: the act of parrying is a defensive skill that reduces an opponent's chance to successfully land an attack, and the purpose of armor is to absorb damage.

The last major element of many BRP games is that there is no difference between the player character race systems and that of the monster or opponents. By varying ability scores, the same system is used for a human hero as a troll villain. This approach allows for players to play a wide variety of non-human species.

Licensed games 
Chaosium was an early adopter of licensing out its BRP system to other companies, something that was unique at the time they began but commonplace now thanks to the d20 licenses.  This places BRP in the notable position of being one of the first products to allow other game companies to develop games or game aids for their work. For example, Other Suns, published by Fantasy Games Unlimited (FGU), used them under license. BRP was also used as the base for the Swedish game Drakar och Demoner from Target Games.

Reception
In the July 1981 edition of The Space Gamer (Issue No. 41), Ronald Pehr commented that "Basic Role-Playing is too little too late. RuneQuest is long established, does an adequate job of teaching role-playing, and there are now even more games to choose from. If you want to teach role-playing to a very young, but literate, child, Basic Role-Playing is excellent. Otherwise, for all its charm, it's not much use.".

In the August 1981 edition of Dragon (Issue 52), John Sapienza noted that Basic Roleplaying was "not a fantasy role-playing game as such, but a handbook on how to role-play and a simple combat system to help the beginner get into the act." Despite this, Sapienza called it "one of the best introductions to the practical social interactions in gaming that I have read, and will give beginning gamers the kind of guidance they typically do not get in the full-scale games they will graduate to, since game writers usually spend their time on mechanics instead of on the proper relationships between player and player, player and referee, or player and character." He concluded, "Basic Role-Playing is a truly universal introduction to the hobby — highly recommended."

Awards 
The BRP itself has been the recipient, via its games, of many awards. Most notable was the 1981 Origins Award for Best Roleplaying Rules for Call of Cthulhu.  Other editions of Call of Cthulhu have also won Origins Awards including the Hall of Fame award. The BRP Character Generation software has also won awards for its design.

References

External links 
 Chaosium's Basic Role-Playing Product Line Page
 Basic Roleplaying Central - The community fansite for Basic Roleplaying game systems.

 
Chaosium games
Greg Stafford games
Role-playing games introduced in 1980
Universal role-playing games